The enzyme 4-hydroxybenzoate decarboxylase catalyzes the chemical reaction

4-hydroxybenzoate  phenol + CO2

This enzyme belongs to the family of lyases, specifically the carboxy-lyases, which cleave carbon-carbon bonds.  The systematic name of this enzyme class is 4-hydroxybenzoate carboxy-lyase (phenol-forming). Other names in common use include p-hydroxybenzoate decarboxylase, and 4-hydroxybenzoate carboxy-lyase.  This enzyme participates in benzoate degradation via CoA ligation.

References

 
 

EC 4.1.1
Enzymes of unknown structure